The Sword of Honour is an honorary sword awarded to that "Gentleman Cadet", "Officer Cadet", "Aviation Cadet" or "Lady Cadet" who achieves an overall best performance during his or her entire training period at the Pakistan Military Academy at Kakul, the Pakistan Air Force Academy at Risalpur, or the Pakistan Naval Academy at Karachi. The award of a Sword of Honour is regarded as a significant honour by the officers of the Armed Forces of Pakistan and many cadets aspire to win it.

This award is usually presented at the final passing out ceremony, which takes place twice in a year at the parade grounds of the respective Academies. Usually, the President of Pakistan confers this honour.

It is to be mentioned that newly appointed chief of army staff Syed Asim Munir Shah was also granted this award.

First Woman Cadet to receive Sword of Honour
On 22 September 2006, aviation cadet Saira Amin was presented with the Sword of Honour at the Passing-Out Parade of the 117th GD Pilot Course.

See also
Pakistan Military Academy
Pakistan Naval Academy
Pakistan Air Force Academy

References

Military awards and decorations of Pakistan
Honorary weapons
Pakistani swords